James Stewart (November 11, 1775 – December 29, 1821) was a Congressional Representative from North Carolina; born in Scotland November 11, 1775; received a liberal education; immigrated to the United States and settled near Stewartsville, North Carolina; engaged in mercantile and agricultural pursuits; member of the North Carolina House of Commons in 1798 and 1799; served in the State senate 1802-1804 and 1813–1815; elected as a Federalist to the Fifteenth Congress to fill the vacancy caused by the death of Alexander McMillan and served from January 5, 1818, to March 3, 1819; resumed mercantile and agricultural pursuits; died near Laurinburg, North Carolina, on December 29, 1821; interment in the Old Stewartsville Cemetery, near Laurinburg.

About 1800, he built the Stewart-Hawley-Malloy House; it was added to the National Register of Historic Places in 1975.

See also 
Fifteenth United States Congress

References

External links 
Entry in US Congress Biographical Directory

Members of the North Carolina House of Representatives
North Carolina state senators
1775 births
1821 deaths
Federalist Party members of the United States House of Representatives from North Carolina